Romanos is a small municipality in Campo de Daroca, in Aragón. It was an important town during the War of the Two Peters, and has many historic sites, such as castles and churches, some of which are part of the 156 monuments that the Government of Aragon presented to UNESCO for the declaration of the sites as historic protected sites. They were confirmed as this in 2001 in the UNESCO meeting in Helsinki.

References

External links

CAI Aragon - Romanos

Municipalities in the Province of Zaragoza